Mooween State Park is a public recreation area covering  in the town of Lebanon, Connecticut. The state park offers hiking and mountain biking plus fishing and boating on  Red Cedar Lake.

History
The park grounds were the home of a summer camp for boys from 1921 through 1960. The state purchased the site in 1989. Originally known as Red Cedar Lake State Park, its name was changed to Mooween in 2000 in recognition of its summer camp past.

References

External links
Mooween State Park Connecticut Department of Energy and Environmental Protection
Mooween State Park Map Connecticut Department of Energy and Environmental Protection

State parks of Connecticut
Parks in New London County, Connecticut
Protected areas established in 1989
1989 establishments in Connecticut
Lebanon, Connecticut